Andreyevka is a rural locality (a village) in Kayrakovsky Selsoviet, Mishkinsky District, Bashkortostan, Russia. The population was 43 as of 2010. There are 2 streets.

Geography 
Andreyevka is located 30 km northwest of Mishkino (the district's administrative centre) by road. Kargino is the nearest rural locality.

References 

Rural localities in Mishkinsky District